Ernesto Rossi (27 March 1827 – 4 June 1896) was an Italian actor and playwright.

Early life and career 
Rossi was born in Livorno to a middle-class family and was intending to study at the university there when he substituted for an actor in the Calloud theatre company who had become ill. After his successful performance, he continued performing with the company until it was dissolved in 1848. In 1852 he joined the Reale Sarda theatre company and became its leading actor. He toured Italy and Paris with Adelaide Ristori until personal differences led to the end of their theatrical partnership, and Majeroni became her leading man. Rossi went on to perform throughout Europe, including London, Vienna, Lisbon, and Moscow. He was particularly admired for his Shakespearean roles as Macbeth, King Lear, Romeo and Hamlet. Rossi also wrote several plays, the first of which, Adele, premiered with Adelaide Ristori in the title role.

In May 1896 he was playing King Lear in Odessa when he fell ill and was brought back to Italy, where he died a few weeks later in Pescara.

Sources
Biography of Rossi (in Italian) from the Museo Biblioteca dell'Attore, Genoa.

External links
Portrait of Ernesto Rossi from the University of Frankfurt library.
 Zakharov N. V., Gaydin B. N. Rossi Ernesto // An Electronic Encyclopaedia “The World of Shakespeare”.

Italian male stage actors
Italian dramatists and playwrights
1827 births
1896 deaths
Male Shakespearean actors
19th-century Italian dramatists and playwrights
19th-century male writers